The 1958 ICF Canoe Sprint World Championships were held in Prague, Czechoslovakia. This event was held under the auspices of the International Canoe Federation.

The men's competition consisted of four Canadian (single paddle, open boat) and nine kayak events. Two events were held for the women, both in kayak. This was the fifth championships in canoe sprint.

The Soviet Union won their first medals at these championships.

Medal summary

Men's

Canoe

Kayak

Women's

Kayak

Medals table

References
ICF medalists for Olympic and World Championships - Part 1: flatwater (now sprint): 1936-2007.
ICF medalists for Olympic and World Championships - Part 2: rest of flatwater (now sprint) and remaining canoeing disciplines: 1936-2007.
Results at Canoeresults.eu

Icf Canoe Sprint World Championships, 1958
Icf Canoe Sprint World Championships, 1958
ICF Canoe Sprint World Championships
International sports competitions hosted by Czechoslovakia
Canoeing in Czechoslovakia